Papillomatosis of skin is skin surface elevation caused by hyperplasia and enlargement of contiguous dermal papillae. These papillary projections of the epidermis form an undulating surface under microscopic examination.

See also 
 Skin lesion
 Skin disease
 List of skin diseases
 Papilloma
 Laryngeal papillomatosis

References

External links 

Dermatologic terminology